Ed Overholser (June 20, 1869 - April 21, 1931) was the 16th mayor of Oklahoma City and a president of Oklahoma City Chamber of Commerce.

Early life and career
Overholser was born in Sullivan, Indiana to Henry Overholser and Emma Hanna Overholser. He was educated in public schools and attended a preparatory school for boys in Kansas. He arrived in Oklahoma City on April 2, 1890, and took over the management of the Overholser Opera House.

In the late 1890s, Overholser helped organized the townsites of Stroud, Wellston, Luther and Jones. He entered public service and worked as the manager of the Oklahoma City waterworks department and was the first Secretary of the State Fair Association. He also served as a school board member and as Chairman of the Board of County Commissioners. He was responsible for the large lake that was named in his honor, Lake Overholser. Overholser married Allie Garrison on May 26, 1903, and had two children, one of whom survived.

Mayor
Overholser won the race for mayor despite being a Republican in a strongly Democratic city. He served from April 13, 1915 to December 24, 1918.

Later life
Overholser became the President of the Oklahoma City Chamber of Commerce from 1922 to 1927. He was responsible for erasing the chamber's debt and increasing the membership to 5,000, an impressive feat at a time when only five cities in the U.S. claimed large memberships. He was a member of a Masonic lodge, the Lutheran Church, and numerous clubs. Illness took his life on April 21, 1931, in Oklahoma City.

References

Mayors of Oklahoma City
1869 births
1931 deaths
People from Sullivan, Indiana